Ricardo Abreu Ribeiro (born 27 January 1990) is a Portuguese footballer who plays for U.D. Oliveirense as a goalkeeper.

Club career
Born in Moreira de Cónegos, Guimarães, Ribeiro joined local Moreirense FC's youth ranks at the age of 11. He was definitely promoted to the first team in 2009–10 with the club in the third division (two games played as the season ended in promotion), going on to act as second or third choice the following years.

Ribeiro made his Primeira Liga debut on 19 August 2012, in a 1–1 away draw against F.C. Paços de Ferreira. He appeared in a further 19 matches during the campaign, which ended in relegation.

In the following years, Ribeiro alternated between the top division and the Segunda Liga, representing G.D. Estoril Praia, Académico de Viseu FC, S.C. Olhanense, C.F. Os Belenenses, Académica de Coimbra and Paços Ferreira. He moved abroad for the first time in his career in September 2020, signing with Saudi First Division League side Al-Jabalain FC as they were managed by his compatriot Filipe Gouveia.

Ribeiro returned to his homeland on 28 July 2022, agreeing to a contract at second-tier U.D. Oliveirense.

Honours
Paços Ferreira
LigaPro: 2018–19

References

External links

1990 births
Living people
Sportspeople from Guimarães
Portuguese footballers
Association football goalkeepers
Primeira Liga players
Liga Portugal 2 players
Segunda Divisão players
Moreirense F.C. players
G.D. Estoril Praia players
Académico de Viseu F.C. players
S.C. Olhanense players
C.F. Os Belenenses players
Associação Académica de Coimbra – O.A.F. players
F.C. Paços de Ferreira players
U.D. Oliveirense players
Saudi First Division League players
Al-Jabalain FC players
Portuguese expatriate footballers
Expatriate footballers in Saudi Arabia
Portuguese expatriate sportspeople in Saudi Arabia